Les Sous-doués en vacances is a 1982 French comedic film, directed by Claude Zidi. It is the sequel to Les sous-doués (1980).

Production
The film was shot between 10 August and 3 October 1981. Roland Moreno, the real life inventor of the smart card, was cast in the film as a "mad inventor" who creates a "love computer."

Florence Guérin recalls how she gave her first line to the cinema in this film: "After passing a day doing a walk-on part, I knew that the next day they needed a girl for a nude scene, but she had a line in it. I begged Claude Zidi, going in front of his boat and he gave in, telling me that maybe the scene would be cut and that they already had another actress. Finally I shot, the scene was not cut, and the end credits read: B.B 1: Florence Guérin."

Sandrine Bonnaire in an extra in the movie.

Release
The film was released in 1982. It was shown in Paris for 22 weeks.

References

External links

1980s teen comedy films
Films directed by Claude Zidi
Films scored by Vladimir Cosma
French teen comedy films
French sequel films
Films set in Paris
Films about vacationing
1980s French-language films
1980s high school films
French high school films
1980s French films